Borthwick Castle, Scottish Borders was a 16th-century L-plan tower house, about  north west of Duns, Scottish Borders, Scotland.

History
The property belonged to the Cockburns.  It was destroyed by quarrying, having become ruinous, after 1970, although it had been excavated before demolition.  Near the site stands a commemorative stone.
It is thought that it was a watchtower and small residence, rather than a place of strength.

Structure
Borthwick Castle had a courtyard surrounding the 16th-century buildings and a later house.  There was a corbelled-out stair-tower in the re-entrant angle of the L-plan tower.  The vaulted basement had a scale-and-platt staircase to the first floor.
Apart from narrow brick in the fireplace and window openings the building was constructed from mortared stone.

See also
Castles in Great Britain and Ireland
List of castles in Scotland

References

Castles in the Scottish Borders